Aylesbury United Football Club is a football club based in Chesham, Buckinghamshire, England. They are currently members of Division One Central of the Southern League and play at Chesham United's Meadow ground, having been evicted from their Buckingham Road ground in 2006. They are nicknamed the Ducks due to the Aylesbury duck.

History
Aylesbury United were formed in 1897 as a merger of Night School, Printing Works and Aylesbury Town. After playing in local leagues, the club joined the Western Division of the Spartan League in 1908, which they won in their first season. This was followed by a play-off with the winners of the Eastern Division, Luton Clarence, which Aylesbury won 4–1. The following season they were placed in the league's A Division, in which they finished as runners-up. With the league becoming a single division in 1910, the club remained in it until World War I, finishing as runners-up again in 1913–14.

After the war the league expanded to two divisions, with Aylesbury placed in Division One. They remained in the division until 1928 when league re-organisation saw Division One split into East and West divisions, with Aylesbury winning Division One West in 1928–29. Further league reorganisation at the end of the season saw the creation of a Premier Division, in which Aylesbury were placed. However, after finishing bottom of the table in 1932–33 they were relegated to Division One. Two seasons later, a second-placed finish saw them promoted back to the Premier Division. The 1937–38 season saw the club relegated again, although they won Division One the following season. However, the league was then suspended due to World War II.

The league resumed in 1945 and was split into three geographic divisions, with Aylesbury in the Western Division, finishing as runners-up in 1945–46. Several clubs left the league at the end of the season, resulting in it being reduced to a single division. In 1951 Aylesbury were founder members of the Delphian League, and the 1951–52 season saw them reach the first round of the FA Cup for the first time. Drawn at home to Watford, they lost 1–0, but the attendance of 7,440 remains a club record. After finishing second in 1952–53, they were league champions the following season. The club remained in the league until it merged into the Athenian League in 1963, with Aylesbury placed in Division Two. A second-place finish in 1967–68 saw them promoted to Division One, where they remained until being relegated at the end of the 1972–73 season.

In 1976 the club joined Division One South of the Southern League, which became the Southern Division in 1979. In 1981 they were transferred to the Midland Division, and were promoted to the Premier Division after finishing as runners-up in 1984–85. The following season saw them reach the first round of the FA Cup again, this time losing 5–2 to Slough Town in a replay after a 2–2 draw. They reached the first round again in 1986–87, losing 3–2 to Bath City. In 1987–88 they won the Premier Division, earning promotion to the Football Conference; they also reached the first round of the FA Cup for the third consecutive season, this time losing 1–0 at Bristol City. At the end of the season the club were the unlikely opponents for the England national team as a warm-up match prior to Euro 88; the match attracted a record crowd of 6,031 to Buckingham Road to see England win 7–0.

Although Aylesbury were relegated at the end of the first season in the division, dropping into the Isthmian League Premier Division, a 1–0 defeat of Waterlooville saw them reach the second round of the FA Cup for the first time, where they lost 1–0 to Sutton United. They remained in the Isthmian League's Premier Division for eleven seasons, finishing as runners-up in 1998–99, and advancing to the first round of the FA Cup in every season between 1989 and 1995; the 1989–90 season saw them beat Football League opposition for the first time when they defeated Southend United 1–0, before losing by the same scoreline to Northampton Town in a second round replay. After being beaten by Walsall in the first round in 1990–91, they reached the second round again in 1991–92, eventually losing 3–2 to Hereford United. Another first round defeat took place in 1992–93 when they were beaten 8–0 at West Bromwich Albion, but the 1994–95 season saw their best performance to date, reaching the third round after defeating fellow non-League clubs Newport (IOW) and Kingstonian before losing 4–0 at QPR. The run included the "duck walk" celebration by Cliff Hercules, the club's record appearance holder and goalscorer, which was featured on the BBC's They Think It's All Over programme. In the same season they won the Isthmian League Cup.

Aylesbury were relegated to Division One in 1999–2000, but a third-place finish in 2000–01 saw them promoted back to the Premier Division; they also reached the first round of the FA Cup for the first time since 1994, this time losing 3–0 at Port Vale. In 2002–03 they reached the semi-finals of the FA Trophy, but lost 2–1 to Burscough over the two legs. In 2004 Aylesbury were transferred to the Premier Division of the Southern League, but were relegated to Division One Midlands in 2005–06. In July 2009, the Aylesbury United Supporters Trust was able to gain control of the club. However, in 2009–10 they finished bottom of the division and were relegated to the Premier Division of the Spartan South Midlands League. After finishing as runners-up in 2012–13, they were promoted to Division One Central of the Southern League.

Ground
Aylesbury played at Turnfurlong Lane until moving to Buckingham Road in the mid-1980s. In July 2006 the lease on the ground expired and they were forced to play matches outside the town. They played at the Meadow in Chesham (groundsharing with Chesham United), before moving to Bell Close in Leighton Buzzard in 2009, where they shared with Leighton Town. In 2015 they began a groundshare at Thame United's Meadow View Park. The club moved back to Chesham United's Meadow ground in 2017.

Honours
Southern League
Premier Division champions 1987–88
Isthmian League
League Cup winners: 1994–95
Delphian League
Champions 1953–54
Spartan League
League champions 1908–09
Western Division champions 1908–09
Division One West champions 1928–29
Division One champions 1938–39
Spartan South Midlands League
Premier Division Cup winners 2012–13
Berks & Bucks Senior Cup
Winners 1913–14, 1985–86, 1996–97, 1999–2000
Berks & Bucks Senior Shield
Winners 2012–13
Berks & Bucks Benevolent Cup
Winners: 1932–33, 1933–34, 1952–53, 1953–54

Statistics

Season-by-season

Records
Highest league position: 20th in Conference National Division 1988–89
Best FA Cup performance: Third round, 1994–95
Best FA Trophy performance: Semi-final, 2002–03
Best FA Vase performance: Fourth round, 1975–76
Record attendance:
Turnfurlong Lane: 7,440 vs Watford, FA Cup first round, 1951–52
Buckingham Road: 6,031 vs England, friendly match,  4 June 1988
Most Appearances: Cliff Hercules, 669 (1984–2002)
Record Goalscorer: Cliff Hercules, 301 (1984–2002)
Biggest win: 10–0 vs Hornchurch & Upminster, Delphian League, 17 April 1954
Worst defeat: 10–1 vs Tilbury, Athenian League Division Two, 19 October 1963; 10–1 vs Harlow Town, Athenian League Division Two, 7 March 1964; 9–0 vs Bishop's Stortford, Delphian League, 8 October 1955

See also
Aylesbury United F.C. players
Aylesbury United F.C. managers

References

External links
Official website

 
Football clubs in England
Football clubs in Buckinghamshire
Aylesbury
Fan-owned football clubs in England
Association football clubs established in 1897
Spartan League
Delphian League
Athenian League
Southern Football League clubs
National League (English football) clubs
Isthmian League
Spartan South Midlands Football League
1897 establishments in England